Mathura may mean:

 Mathura, Uttar Pradesh, historic city in India
 Mathura district, in which the city is located
 Mathura (Lok Sabha constituency)
 Mathura lion capital, Indo-Scythian sandstone capital from Mathura, dated to the 1st century CE
 Mathura (moth), a synonym of a genus of moths in the family Erebidae
 Madurai (also transliterated as Mathura), Tamil Nadu
 Mathra (also transliterated as Mathura), Kerala
 Mathra, North West Frontier, a corruption of "Mathura"

See also 

 Mathur (disambiguation)